Haemaphysalis spinigera, is a hard-bodied tick of the genus Haemaphysalis. It is found in India, Sri Lanka, Vietnam. It is an obligate ectoparasite of mammals of various rodents, insectivores and monkeys. It is a potential vector of Kyasanur Forest disease virus, and Kaisodi virus.

References

External links
The Mid-Gut Epithelium of the Tick Haemaphysalis Spinigera Neumann 1897
Relation of Haemaphysalis spinigera larval infection rates and host viremia levels of Kyasanur Forest Disease virus.
Observation on the Saliva and Salivary Gland Extract of Haemaphysalis spinigera and Rhipicephalus sanguineus sanguineus

Ticks
Ixodidae
Animals described in 1997